Kwak Pom-gi (born 20 November 1939) is a North Korean government official.

After graduating from Huichon Industrial College, he began his career in 1983 as a machine factory manager, progressing through the machinery bureau of the Workers' Party of Korea, becoming an alternate member of the party's 6th Central Committee in 1993. He has been Vice-Premier of the government from 1998 to 2010, and is a member of the Secretariat of the Workers' Party of Korea. He is described as a "technocrat" in the North Korean leadership.

In October 2003,  Kwak gave a speech celebrating the Ryugyong Jong Ju Yong Indoor Stadium at the Mansudae Art Theatre, which is an indoor stadium built on the bank of the River Potong.

In August 2006, Kwak, with Russian Ambassador Andrei Karlov, was at the opening of the first Russian Orthodox Church in Pyongyang, North Korea. The church was opened to improve the development of Russian–North Korean relations according to Korean Orthodox Church Committee Chairman Ho Il Jin. The North Korean government would "successfully administer" the church, which was built to hold 500 people.

On 6 January 2007, at a mass rally in Pyongyang which included Kim Jong-il, he gave a speech praising the North Korean government for building nuclear weapons. He also addressed the country's "problem of food scarcity" in 2007, saying, "The Cabinet will concentrate state efforts on agriculture this year, too, considering it a mainstay, to thoroughly implement the WPK's policy of agriculture revolution and make a signal advance in the efforts to settle the people's food problem."

He served as WPK South Hamgyong provincial secretary from 2010, where he led an effort to develop local industry which was celebrated as "flames of Hamnam". Likely as a result of this, he was elevated to Politburo alternate member and director of the Party Finance and Accounting Department in April 2012, and chairman of the Supreme People's Assembly Budget Committee in September of the same year. He has been speculated as the head of the new Party Economy Department, reportedly established in June 2013.

References

External links
North Korea Leadership Watch - Pak Pom Gi
North Korean Economy Watch: DPRK joint editorial 2007: Usher In a Great Heyday of Songun Korea Full of Confidence in Victory

Living people
Korean communists
1939 births
Members of the Supreme People's Assembly
Alternate members of the 6th Politburo of the Workers' Party of Korea
Members of the 6th Central Committee of the Workers' Party of Korea
Vice Chairmen of the Workers' Party of Korea and its predecessors